Tanner Vallejo (born December 16, 1994) is an American football linebacker for the Arizona Cardinals of the National Football League (NFL). He played college football at Boise State. He was drafted by the Buffalo Bills in the sixth round of the 2017 NFL Draft. Vallejo also previously played for the Cleveland Browns, and Washington Redskins.

Early years 
Playing for Nevada Union High School, Vallejo earned MaxPreps All-American honors his senior year. In addition to football, he played baseball for Nevada Union. Tanner's grandfather was born in Ecuador.

College career
Playing at Boise State, Vallejo had 100 tackles as a sophomore, but ended his final season of college ball early to have wrist surgery. During that sophomore season, he blocked two kicks in one game to help secure a 28–0 Broncos win. Pro Football Focus noted his speed and ability to break up plays in the backfield. However, they touched on his lack of size and poor tackling efficiency his senior year in their scouting report.

Professional career

Buffalo Bills
The Buffalo Bills selected Vallejo in the sixth round (195th overall) of the 2017 NFL Draft. He was the second linebacker drafted by the Bills in 2017, behind Matt Milano, and was expected to fill the Bills' immediate need at weak-side linebacker.

On May 11, 2017, the Buffalo Bills signed Vallejo to a four-year, $2.55 million contract that includes a signing bonus of $153,799.

He injured his knee in the preseason but still managed to hang on to a roster spot.

Vallejo was waived by the Bills on September 1, 2018.

Cleveland Browns
On September 2, 2018, Vallejo was claimed off waivers by the Cleveland Browns. He played in 13 games before being placed on injured reserve on December 28, 2018 with a hamstring injury.

On February 4, 2019, Vallejo was waived by the Browns.

Arizona Cardinals
On February 5, 2019, Vallejo was claimed off waivers by the Arizona Cardinals. Vallejo was waived following the final roster cuts on September 1, 2019.

Washington Redskins
Vallejo was claimed off waivers by the Washington Redskins on September 2, 2019. He was waived on November 16, 2019.

Arizona Cardinals (second stint)
On November 20, 2019, Vallejo was signed to the Arizona Cardinals practice squad. On December 4, 2019, Vallejo was promoted to the active roster. In week 14 against the Pittsburgh Steelers, Vallejo recorded a sack on quarterback Devlin Hodges and forced a fumble on running back Benny Snell which was recovered by teammate Terrell Suggs in the 23–17 loss. He was placed on injured reserve on December 18, 2019.

In Week 17 of the 2020 season against the Los Angeles Rams, led the team with 12 tackles and recorded his first sack of the season on John Wolford during the 18–7 loss.

On March 17, 2021, Vallejo re-signed with the Cardinals on a two-year, $4.1 million contract. He was placed on injured reserve on November 20 with a knee injury. He was activated on January 1, 2022.

References

External links
Boise State Broncos bio

1994 births
Living people
American football linebackers
Arizona Cardinals players
Boise State Broncos football players
Buffalo Bills players
Cleveland Browns players
People from Nevada County, California
Players of American football from California
Washington Redskins players